Valcke is a surname. Notable people with the surname include:

Jérôme Valcke (born 1960), French football manager
Viceroy Louis Valcke (1857–1940), Belgian soldier and colonial administrator.
Paul Valcke (born 1914), Belgian fencer
Pierre Valcke, Belgian field hockey player

See also
Valck